Elli Parvo (17 October 1915 – 19 February 2010) was an Italian film actress, born in Milan as Elvira Gobbo. She appeared in more than 50 films between 1934 and 1960.

Selected filmography

 Loyalty of Love (1934) as La nobildonna al ballo
 The Ferocious Saladin (1937) as l'attrice truccata all'orientale
 Abandon All Hope (1937) as Gemma
 I Want to Live with Letizia (1938) as Unknown role 
 Departure (1938) as La contadina con il neonato
 The Marquis of Ruvolito (1939) as Immacolata 
 The Night of Tricks (1939) as Maria
 The Happy Ghost (1941) as Erika
 The King's Jester (1941) as La zingara
 Beatrice Cenci (1941) as Angela
 Carmen (1942) as Pamela
 Seven Years of Good Luck (1942) as Melitta
 Seven Years of Happiness (1943) as Melitta, la cameriera
 Il fanciullo del West (1943) as Lolita de Fuego
 The Gates of Heaven (1945) as La signora provocante
 Desire (1946) as Paola Previtali
 A Yank in Rome (1946) as Elena
 The Sun Still Rises (1946) as Matilde
 The Brothers Karamazov (1947) as Gruscenka
 Vertigine d'amore (1948) as Silvana
 The Mysterious Rider (1948) as Dogaressa
 L'urlo (1948) as Silvia
 Toto the Third Man (1951) as Teresa, moglie di Paolo
 His Last Twelve Hours (1951) as la contessa Lidia Guidi
 Voto di marinaio (1952) as Mimì
 Rosalba, la fanciulla di Pompei (1952) as Laura
 The Art of Getting Along (1954) as Emma
 Loves of Three Queens (1954) as Junon
 L'ultimo amante (1955) as Clelia
 Allow Me, Daddy! (1956) as Fasòli
 The Goddess of Love (1957) as Elena
 World of Miracles (1959) as Magda Damiani

References

External links

1915 births
2010 deaths
Italian film actresses
Actresses from Milan